Claude Malleville, born in Paris probably between 1594 and 1596 and died in the same city in 1647, was a French poet. He became one of the first members of the Académie Française in 1634.

His life 
Knowledge about Claude Malleville's life was for a long time reduced to the following notice by his contemporary Paul Pellisson:

This succinct and partly erroneous notice must now be replaced by a work by Maurice Cauchie, published in 1923, and corrected on certain points by R. Ortali.

The works 
In his youth, Malleville was a member of the cenacle of the :fr:Illustres Bergers, a circle of Catholic ronsardian poets and scholars , in which he was identified with Damon.

A member of the circles of Valentin Conrart and of Marie de Gournay, a regular at the Hôtel de Rambouillet, Malleville contributed a dozen poems to the Guirlande de Julie. His most famous sonnet, La Belle Matineuse, was composed on the occasion of a poetic joust with Vincent Voiture on a theme that goes back to the Latin poet Catullus and was taken up successively by Clément Marot, Joachim du Bellay, Francis I of France, Annibale Caro and François Tristan l'Hermite. Like other French poets of the time, he wrote sonnets on the themes of La Belle More, La Belle Gueuse and La Belle Baigneuse, borrowed from Giambattista Marino. The name of Malleville has long been known to the general educated public only by this appreciation of Nicolas Boileau: "A sonnet without faults alone is worth a long poem. / But in vain a thousand authors think they can do it; / And that happy phoenix is yet to be found. / Barely in Gombaut, Maynard and Malleville, / Can you admire two or three out of a thousand. »

In addition to his sonnets imitated from the Italian mentioned above (and of which he also treats certain themes in Stances), praised poems of Malleville are his elegy on the death of the Princess of Conti, lover of Bassompierre and perhaps secretly married to him, his paraphrase of Psalm XXX Exaltabo Te Domine and a heroic priapaea on the famous Ethiopian Zaga Christ, which, according to several critics, is his masterpiece.

Publications 
L'Almerinde (1646) and La Stratonice (1649). Translated from the Italian of Luca Assarino by Pierre d'Audiguier le jeune et Claude de Malleville.
Poésies du sieur de Malleville (1649), online.
Diverses poésies de l'Académie. Divers sonnets, stances, élégies, chansons, madrigaux, épigrammes & rondeaux (1664), online.
Mémoires du maréchal de Bassompierre, contenans l'histoire de sa vie (4 volumes, 1723).
Œuvres poétiques, critical edition by Raymond Ortali, Didier, Paris, 1976.

Notes and references 

17th-century French writers
17th-century French poets
Members of the Académie Française
1647 deaths
Deaths in Paris